The Passport is a 2018 Iranian short film written and directed by Hanieh Bavali. It won Creativity Award at A Show For A Change film festival in California and Audience award of Ongezien Kort festival in Belgium. also film was screened at many festivals in various cities of  US and elsewhere.

Plot 

A young photographer takes passport photos of others who want to leave Iran, while he must stay.

References 

2018 films
2010s Persian-language films
Iranian short films
2018 short films